Pinheyschna rileyi, the Riley's hawker,  is a species of dragonfly in the family Aeshnidae. It is found in Angola, Kenya, Malawi, Mozambique, Sudan, Tanzania, Uganda, Zambia, Zimbabwe, and possibly Burundi. Its natural habitats are subtropical or tropical dry forests, subtropical or tropical moist montane forests, subtropical or tropical high-altitude shrubland, and rivers.

References

Aeshnidae
Insects described in 1892
Taxonomy articles created by Polbot
Odonata of Africa